Peter Dunoff (July 11, 1864 – December 27, 1944), also known by his spiritual name Beinsa Douno, and often called the Master by his followers, was a Bulgarian philosopher and spiritual teacher who developed a form of Esoteric Christianity known as the Universal White Brotherhood. He is widely known in Bulgaria, where he was voted second by the public in the Great Bulgarians TV show on Bulgarian National Television (2006-2007). Dunoff is also featured in Pantev and Gavrilov's The 100 Most Influential Bulgarians in Our History (ranked in 37th place). According to Petrov, Peter Deunov is “the most published Bulgarian author to this day.”

Biography

Early life
Peter Dunoff was born in the village of Hadardja (now Nikolaevka in Suvorovo Municipality) near Varna, Bulgaria on July 11, 1864, the third child of Konstantin Dunoffsky and Dobra Atanasova Georgieva. His father was the first Bulgarian teacher in the region before becoming a Bulgarian Orthodox priest. He was one of the first to present the liturgy in Bulgarian, the language of the local people, rather than the traditional sacred language of Church Slavonic (Old Bulgarian).

Dunoff attended secondary school in Varna and the American Methodist School of Theology and Science in Svishtov, from which he graduated in 1886. He worked as a primary school teacher for a year before leaving for the United States, where he studied theology at Drew Theological Seminary in Madison, New Jersey, from 1888 to May 1892. After graduating from Drew, in the fall of 1892 he enrolled in the Boston University School of Theology and obtained his degree in June 1893 with a thesis on "The Migration of the Germanic Tribes and Their Christianisation" (published in 2007). He was a regular student at the School of Medicine of Boston University for a year, before returning to Bulgaria in 1895.

Return to Bulgaria 
Upon his return to Bulgaria Dunoff was offered the position of a Methodist pastor in the city of Yambol. This offer was withdrawn after he stipulated he would only serve without remuneration. In 1896 he published Science and Education, in which he analyzed the development of mankind into a new culture, which he thought was bound to take place during the forthcoming century. After the turn of the century, Dunoff began to travel throughout Bulgaria for several years, giving talks and undertaking phrenological research. He met with a wide circle of people. Among them were his first three disciples, who had belonged to different branches of Christianity – Todor Stoimenov (Eastern Orthodox), Dr. Mirkovich (Catholic) and Penyu Kirov (Protestant). After a long correspondence, all of them met in Varna during 19–23 July 1900. It is considered the first annual convention of what later became a spiritual community that lasted until the end of Dunoff's life. Dunoff eventually settled in Sofia, the capital of Bulgaria, and began giving lectures.

In 1914 he gave his first public lecture, Behold, the Man! (Ecce Homo in Latin), published later in the series Power and Life. Dunoff began to give regular Sunday lectures which were based on the elaboration and explanation of a Biblical passage. 

In 1921 the community Izgrev (Sunrise) was established. A site at what were then the outskirts of Sofia, it was the gathering place in the mornings for Dunoff and his disciples. Many followers started building nearby and the place eventually became the center of a large spiritual community. Dunoff gave lectures in the newly constructed Lecture Hall. In 1922 he initiated two new streams of specialized lectures in addition to the Sunday lectures, and from 1930 began delivering “morning talks” on Sunday mornings before dawn. The themes of the different lecture streams were wide-ranging and encompassed, among others: religion, music, geometry, astrology, philosophy and esoteric science. Overall, Dunoff gave approximately 3700 lectures in the three decades between 1914 and 1944. His thoughts were also recorded in talks, private conversations, and early letters.

Paneurhythmy 

In 1932, he developed Paneurhythmy exercises: a sequence of exercises performed to music, to achieve inner balance and harmonization. This practice promotes the processes of self-perfecting, expanding of the consciousness and attaining of virtues. The circle dance, is a conscious interchange between human beings and the forces of living nature. Each movement is the expression of a thought. The effect should be that the observer picks up from the movements, the thought or the idea they express. The rhythm in the movement of the physical body leads us to one in our spiritual life.

Etymologically, "Pan-Eu-Rhythmy" is derived from three roots: 
Pan - meaning Whole; Universal and Cosmic. 
Eu - meaning True or Supreme; the essential and substantial in the world. 
Rhythmy - meaning correctness in the movements and in every other external expression in life.

Late life 
On March 22, 1939 he wrote a message to his disciples entitled "The Eternal Covenant of the Spirit." At the beginning of 1944, during the air bombardments over Sofia, he organized the evacuation to the village of Marchaevo (24 km southwest of Sofia) and settled in the home (now museum) of his pupil Temelko Gyorev. He returned to Izgrev on October 19, 1944. On December 20, 1944, he delivered the lecture "The Last Word" to the Common Occult Class and died on 27 December.

Legacy 
Several thousand of Dunoff's lectures were recorded by stenographers and are documented in the form of deciphered stenograms (some modified by editing and others left intact ). These contain the essence of Dunoff's teaching. There are also a number of songs and prayers, among which The Good Prayer from 1900 is regarded as the most special.

References

Further reading 

 The Wellspring of Good: The Last Words of the Master Peter Dunoff, Compiled by Bojan Boev and Boris Nikolov, Kibea Publishing Company, 2002.
 David Lorimer, ed.  Gems of Love and Wisdom – Prayers, Meditations and Reflections by Beinsa Douno (Peter Dunoff). Element Books Ltd, 1991.
 
 Ardella Nathanael. Dance of the Soul: Peter Dunoff’s Pan-Eu-Rhythmy, Carlsbad, CA, Esoteric Publishing, 2006.
 Ardella Nathanael. The Butterfly Dance: Peter Dunoff’s PanEuRhythmy, San Rafael, CA, CreateSpace, 2010.

External links 
 Society of the White Brotherhood, Bulgaria (English version) Official website - biographical details, brief information about Dunoff's teaching, forums (Bulgarian only), and other resources.
 The English Master Peter Dunoff (Beinsa Douno) Home Page - English translations of lectures, prayers and other works by Dunoff from authentic sources, as well as discussions of various topics related to his life and teaching.
http://en-petardanov.com/forum/4-1914/ - Another site with English translations of lectures, prayers and other works by Dunoff
 Power and Life - in several languages, with translations of lectures sourced from around the Internet.
 Paneurhythmy - comprehensive site with background information and videos.

Christian philosophers
Esoteric Christianity
Sermon writers
1864 births
1944 deaths
Drew University alumni
Boston University School of Theology alumni
20th-century Bulgarian philosophers
Spiritual teachers
Occult writers
People from Varna Province
Lecturers
Bulgarian expatriates in the United States
Bulgarian esotericists